Louth is a parliamentary constituency represented in Dáil Éireann, the lower house of the Irish parliament or Oireachtas. The constituency elects 5 deputies (Teachtaí Dála, commonly known as TDs) on the system of proportional representation by means of the single transferable vote (PR-STV).

Boundaries
The constituency was created by the Electoral Act 1923, and first used at the 1923 general election. It currently spans the entire area of County Louth, the smallest county in Ireland, and East Meath, taking in Dundalk, Drogheda, Laytown, Bettystown, Mornington and Ardee. The boundaries enlarged at the 2011 general election to include an area of County Meath adjacent to the town of Drogheda. This followed a recommendation of the Report of the Constituency Commission on Dáil and European Parliament Constituencies 2007 outlined "by extending the constituency southwards from, and in the environs of, Drogheda and taking in electoral divisions which have extensive linkages with the town. This will allow the inclusion of the town of Drogheda and hinterland areas in a single constituency." This revision also increased the number of seats to 5.

The Electoral (Amendment) (Dáil Constituencies) Act 2017 defines the constituency as:

TDs

Electoral division
Louth population as per electoral division, for the Dáil constituency of Louth. This population count includes those within the county of Louth, as well as the electoral divisions of Julianstown, and St. Mary's (part) in the county of Meath, as per the Electoral (Amendment) (Dáil Constituencies) Act 2017.

Elections

2020 general election

2016 general election

2011 general election
Séamus Kirk was Ceann Comhairle at the dissolution of the 30th Dáil and therefore deemed to be returned automatically. The constituency was treated as a four-seater for the purposes of calculating the quota.

2007 general election

2002 general election

1997 general election

1992 general election

1989 general election

1987 general election

November 1982 general election

February 1982 general election

1981 general election
Pádraig Faulkner was Ceann Comhairle at the dissolution of the 21st Dáil and therefore deemed to be returned automatically. The constituency was treated as a three-seater for the purposes of calculating the quota.

1977 general election

1973 general election

1969 general election

1965 general election

1961 general election

1957 general election

1954 general election

1954 by-election
Following the death of Fine Gael TD James Coburn, a by-election was held on 3 March 1954. The seat was won by the Fine Gael candidate George Coburn, son of the deceased TD.

1951 general election

1948 general election

1944 general election

1943 general election

1938 general election

1937 general election

1933 general election

1932 general election

September 1927 general election

June 1927 general election

1923 general election

See also
Elections in the Republic of Ireland
Politics of the Republic of Ireland
List of Dáil by-elections
List of political parties in the Republic of Ireland

References

Dáil constituencies
Politics of County Louth
1923 establishments in Ireland
Constituencies established in 1923